Le Galion des Appalaches is a Francophone K-8 school in Campbellton, New Brunswick. It was recently built and opened in January 2018. When it opened, it combined all students from Apollo XI, in Campbellton, Versant-Nord in Atholville, Mgr Melanson in Val-d'Amours, and Rendez-vous des Jeunes in Saint-Arthur, as well as the 7th and 8th graders from the Polyvalente Roland-Pépin, just up the street. The school houses 605 students in total.

References

Elementary schools in New Brunswick
Middle schools in New Brunswick